My Resistance is the third EP album by Japanese visual kei band Diaura, released on 16 December, 2016, by Ains. It was 27th on the Oricon weekly chart, and third on the Indies chart. It was released in two versions: the last song on A type is "Criminal Beast", while it is "Daybreaker" on B type. A type also includes a DVD with the music video of "" and the making-of footage of the MV. The band appeared live on Niconico on 19 November to promote the release of the album.

Track listing

References

2016 EPs
Diaura albums